Two Hands is the fourth studio album by the American band Big Thief, released through 4AD on October 11, 2019. The album comes five months after the release of the band's third studio album, U.F.O.F., and is described as its "earth twin". It was preceded by the singles "Not" and "Forgotten Eyes".

Background and recording
Recording for Two Hands began only days after the band completed recording their third studio album, U.F.O.F., at Bear Creek Studio in Woodinville, Washington. Two Hands was recorded primarily at Sonic Ranch in Tornillo, Texas in July 2018. It was produced by Andrew Sarlo, who had since produced every album by Big Thief. Compared to the lush nature setting of Bear Creek, Sonic Ranch is located in the dry, hot Chihuahuan Desert of Texas. The album's press release indicated the studio was chosen purposely for its "vast desert location", with the songs reflecting its influence. The songs were recorded live with almost no overdubs and all but two songs feature entirely live vocal takes. The album was mixed by Sarlo and drummer James Krivchenia at Bunker Studios in Brooklyn, New York in October 2018; and at Sarlo's Cabin and Sound City in Los Angeles in April 2019.

The band decided to scrap the Sonic Ranch recording of "Not" because they "felt it needed openness." "Not" was re-recorded at Sound City Studios in April 2019. It was captured live on the first take.

"Replaced", co-written by Adrianne Lenker and Buck Meek, appears on the album in its original demo recording. The demo was recorded in a cabin in Topanga Canyon in February 2019.

Music and lyrics
In the album's press release, Adrianne Lenker said, "Two Hands has the songs that I'm the most proud of; I can imagine myself singing them when I'm old. Musically and lyrically, you can't break it down much further than this. It's already bare-bones."

Composition
Two Hands sees Big Thief take on "powerful and gritty" grunge-folk. It also works in indie rock, yielding a "crisper [and] more jagged" sound than that of U.F.O.F.

Slant saw the music as shoegazing that had 1960s / '70s folk and rock filtered through it.

Release and promotion
In early August, some fans who had purchased U.F.O.F. on vinyl from the 4AD website received an unmarked 7" record in the mail. It contained two songs that were later revealed to be the title track "Two Hands" and "Love In Mine", a track appearing on the Japanese version of the album. The 7" had "10/11/19" etched into it, alluding to the release date.

The album was announced on August 13, 2019, alongside the release of its first single, "Not". Upon release, the song was awarded the "Best New Track" distinction by Pitchfork, with Quinn Moreland calling it "a towering statement from a group constantly leapfrogging over themselves."

On the August 19, 2019, the band performed Two Hands in full during an intimate show at London's Bush Hall.

A second song from the album, "Forgotten Eyes", was released on October 2, 2019.

"Not" was nominated for Best Rock Song and Best Rock Performance at the 63rd Annual Grammy Awards.

In December 2019, Spin named Two Hands as the best album of 2019 in its annual critic's picks.

Track listing

Personnel
Credits adapted from the album's liner notes.

Big Thief
 Adrianne Lenker – guitar (all tracks), vocals (all tracks)
 Buck Meek – guitar (all tracks), vocals (3–5, 9)
 Max Oleartchik – bass (all tracks), vocals (1), percussion (3)
 James Krivchenia – drums (1–7, 9, 10), vocals (1, 7), percussion (4), mallets (7), cymbal (8)

Technical personnel
 Andrew Sarlo – production (all tracks), mixing (3, 4, 6–9), engineering (7)
 Dom Monks – engineering (1–6, 8, 10)
 James Krivchenia – mixing (1–6, 8–10), engineering (9)
 Greg Calbi – mastering
 Todd Carder – tape liaison
 Keith Nelson – tape liaison
 Sam Griffin Owens – tape liaison
 Mario Ramirez – assistance (Sonic Ranch)
 Joseph Lorge – assistance (Sound City)

Artwork
 Dustin Condren – cover photography
 Sarah Schiesser – design, layout

In popular culture
The album's title track was featured in the fourth episode of the HBO miniseries Mare of Easttown (2021).

Charts

References

2019 albums
Big Thief albums
4AD albums
Albums recorded at Sonic Ranch
Albums recorded at Sound City Studios
Shoegaze albums
Grunge albums